Helcystogramma deltophora is a moth in the family Gelechiidae. It was described by Anthonie Johannes Theodorus Janse in 1954. It is found in Namibia.

References

Moths described in 1954
deltophora
Moths of Africa